Cruachan Reservoir  is a reservoir in Scotland. It is located to the north west of Loch Awe, in a corrie beneath Ben Cruachan. It is the upper reservoir for the Cruachan Power Station pumped-storage scheme.

The water level in the reservoir can fluctuate by as much as  a day due to the operation of the power station.

References

Reservoirs in Argyll and Bute
Reservoirs in Scotland